The Little Walls is a crime novel by Winston Graham. It won the very first Gold Dagger, then called Crossed Red Herring Award, awarded by the Crime Writers' Association in 1955. The authorized abridgement was published in USA in 1955 as Bridge to Vengeance.

Plot introduction
The novel tells the story of Phillip Turner who refuses to believe that his brother's death was suicide. He sets out to find out how his brother Grevil, an eminent archaeologist, came to be found dead in an Amsterdam canal. The official investigation is led by Inspector J.J. Tholen.

Publication history
1955, UK, London, Hodder and Stoughton,  OCLC: 59014574, Hardback
1955, USA, Garden City, N.Y., Doubleday, OCLC:	1684192, Hardback
1955, USA, New York, Mercury Press, OCLC: 190864334, Authorized abridgement as Bridge to Vengeance

1955 British novels
British crime novels
Hodder & Stoughton books
Novels set in Amsterdam
Novels by Winston Graham